Milorad Dodik (born 12 March 1959) is a Bosnian Serb politician serving as the 8th president of Republika Srpska since November 2022. Previously, he served as the 7th Serb member of the Presidency of Bosnia and Herzegovina, the collective federal head of state, from 2018 to 2022.

Dodik has also been serving as the president of the Alliance of Independent Social Democrats (SNSD) since its creation in 1996, and has occupied a number of political positions in Republika Srpska, the Serb-majority entity of Bosnia and Herzegovina. Dodik was the prime minister of Republika Srpska from 1998 to 2001 and from 2006 to 2010, and the president of Republika Srpska from 2010 until 2018.

Much like the SNSD, Dodik was initially considered as a moderate and reformist alternative to the ultranationalist Serb Democratic Party in the 1990s and early 2000s. However, since then, Dodik and the SNSD have pursued an increasingly-nationalist and separatist line, invoking the right of the Bosnian Serbs to self-determination. His time in power has been characterised by authoritarianism, repudiation of federal Bosnian institutions, and closer connections to Serbia and Russia.

Early life and education
Dodik was born in Banja Luka to Bogoljub and Mira Dodik. He lived in Laktaši, where he attended elementary school. There, he played on the town's basketball team in Yugoslavia's amateur league.  In 1978 he graduated from an agricultural high school in Banja Luka, after which he entered the Faculty of Political Sciences at the University of Belgrade, where he graduated in 1983.

Early political career (1986–1998)
From 1986 through 1990, Dodik was the Chairman of the executive board of the Municipal Assembly of Laktaši. In 1990, at the first multi-party elections in Bosnia and Herzegovina, he was elected to the Assembly of the Socialist Republic of Bosnia and Herzegovina, as a candidate of the Union of Reform Forces of Yugoslavia and was a political disciple of liberal reformer Ante Marković. During the Bosnian War, Dodik served as a representative in the National Assembly of Republika Srpska.

During that time, he formed the Independent Members of Parliament Caucus (Клуб независних посланика у Народној Скупштини Републике Српске, Klub nezavisnih poslanika u Narodnoj Skupštini Republike Srpske), which was the only political opposition to the Serb Democratic Party (Српска демократска странка, Srpska demokratska stranka), which held the absolute majority in the war-time parliament of the Republika Srpska. The caucus he chaired was to form the core of the Party of Independent Social Democrats (Stranka nezavisnih socijaldemokrata, or SNSD) in 1996, after the peace was signed as a result of the Dayton Agreement. He was elected as the first President of SNSD. The party later united with another social-democratic party to form the Alliance of Independent Social Democrats, of which Dodik is president.

Prime Minister of Republika Srpska

First term (1998–2001)

After conflicts between Biljana Plavšić with the rest of Radovan Karadžić's Serb Democratic Party (SDS), she founded a new political party, the Serb National Alliance (SNS). Early elections in Republika Srpska were held in 1997, after which Plavšić and her SNS closely cooperated with the smaller Serbian socialist parties (Socialist Party and Dodik's SNSD). Dodik was nominated Prime Minister of Republika Srpska, even though his party had only two seats in the National Assembly.

Second term (2006–2010)

During the campaign for the 2006 general election, following Montenegrin independence, Dodik said that Republika Srpska didn't rule out its right for an independence referendum. At the election, Dodik's SNSD won 46.9% percent of votes, while the SDS won 19.5%. The international community saw him as a moderate democratic leader of Republika Srpska. Dodik had support from Western countries that were seeking to marginalise the Serbian nationalists. They believed that they had found an alternative in Dodik. After he became a prime minister, the West continued to support him at the expense of Serb nationalist parties. The Western countries promised that, if Dodik remains the prime minister, Republika Srpska would receive Western economic assistance. The OHR and the Western powers also wanted to ensure that he realised his promise to return 70,000 Croat and Bosniak refugees to Republika Srpska.

As promised, after Dodik won the election, Republika Srpska received financial aid from the European Union, that money was used to pay salaries for civil servants and the police. In mid-February 2007, Dodik traveled to the United States, where he was received by Madeleine Albright. She described him as "a breath of fresh air" and pledged €3.6 million of immediate aid. Republika Srpska also received aid from the British government in the same month. British Foreign Secretary, Robin Cook, said in front of the National Assembly of Republika Srpska that Dodik's government "did more in its first two weeks to improve the lives of the people than its predecessor did in two years."

Later, Dodik became the most powerful Serb politician in Bosnia and Herzegovina and later the West viewed him as "an unabashed nationalist and the greatest threat to Bosnia and Herzegovina's fragile, multiethnic peace." After he became a prime minister, Dodik became even more nationalist than the SDS. During a police reform in Republika Srpska, Dodik managed to create a nationalist profile for himself. Haris Silajdžić, meanwhile, won election for Bosniak member of the Presidency of Bosnia and Herzegovina. As he was a minister during the Bosnian War and close associate of Alija Izetbegović, Silajdžić criticised Republika Srpska as genocidal entity and called for its abolition. Moreover, Silajdžić advocated further centralisation of Bosnia and Herzegovina.

On 5 May 2008, Dodik and Serbian President Boris Tadić inaugurated the Park Republika Srpska in Belgrade.

On 1 June 2008, during a visit to Zagreb, Dodik stated that Operation Storm was an act of ethnic cleansing carried out against Serbs and regarded it the "greatest ethnic cleansing committed after World War II". Croatian president Stjepan Mesić criticised Dodik for encouraging dissatisfied Serbs in Croatia to live in Republika Srpska while neglecting to invite Bosniak and Croat refugees to return. Ivo Banac, president of the Croatian Helsinki Committee, stated that Croatia had been defending itself at the time, and criticized Dodik's comments as provocations.

On 12 December 2008, Dodik stated that Muslim judges should not be allowed to preside over cases in Republika Srpska. He elaborated that "it is unacceptable for RS that Muslim judges try us and throw out complaints that are legally founded. And we think that it is only because they are Muslims, Bosniaks and that they have a negative orientation towards the RS, and we see the conspiracy that has been created." Dodik's comments were condemned as "extremely chauvinistic" by international institutions, the United States Embassy in Sarajevo and other officials.

On 9 September 2009, he and Boris Tadić, President of Serbia, opened a school in Pale with the name "Serbia". Bosniak and Croat members of the tripartite Presidency of Bosnia and Herzegovina were not consulted about Tadić's trip.

On 27 October 2009, Dodik provided an RS government jet to pick up Biljana Plavšić, former President of Republika Srpska convicted of war crimes, and welcomed her to Belgrade after her early release from a Swedish prison. He cited "purely moral reasons" for doing so. Željko Komšić, Croat member of the Bosnian Presidency, cancelled a planned visit to Sweden in protest.

In November 2009, Dodik refused to hand over requested documents detailing the financing of a government building complex in Banja Luka worth 110 million euro and the construction of a highway to international prosecutors at the Court of Bosnia and Herzegovina. He stated that the court had no jurisdiction over Republika Srpska and filed a lawsuit against Deputy High Representative Raffi Gregorian  and international prosecutors. Dodik accused Gregorian of leading a plot against Republika Srpska and said a bias against Serbs existed among central-level prosecutors and judges.

On 10 November 2009, Dodik revealed that he seriously considered giving Biljana Plavšić an office in the Senate. He stated "we are working on revising the law on the President of the Republic, which would award Plavšić, and other former presidents, the opportunity to enjoy some privileges like the office, monetary compensation, counselor, secretary, official car with a driver and so forth." Mladen Bosić, leader of the Serb Democratic Party, criticized Dodik.

On 19 January 2010, Croatian president Stjepan Mesić stated that if Dodik were to call a referendum for independence for Republika Srpska he would send the Croatian military to intervene.

Presidency (2018–2022)

2018 general election

Dodik announced his candidacy in the Bosnian general election on 26 December 2017, running for Bosnia's three-person Presidency member, representing the Serbs.

At the general election, held on 7 October 2018, Dodik was elected to the Presidency, having obtained 53.88% of the vote. The incumbent Bosnian Serb presidency member Mladen Ivanić, was second with 42.74%.

Domestic policy

In the first month of his presidency, Dodik had a confrontation with the newly elected Bosniak Presidency member Šefik Džaferović, with Dodik stating he would not attend the first Presidency session under the new leadership until the flag of Republika Srpska, the entity of Bosnia and Herzegovina, was put in his office. He eventually relented, agreeing to hold the session with only the flag of Bosnia and Herzegovina.

In March 2019, Dodik appointed acclaimed filmmaker Emir Kusturica as his advisor.

On 28 January 2021, the Central Election Commission of Bosnia and Herzegovina reported Dodik to the Prosecutor's Office of Bosnia and Herzegovina for spreading national hatred. He was reported for verbally insulting Central Election Commission member Vanja Bjelica-Prutina for deciding to repeat the 2020 Bosnian municipal elections in the cities of Doboj and Srebrenica, where Dodik's party had won, because of electoral irregularities.

On 22 May 2021, Džaferović and Croat Presidency member Željko Komšić attended a military exercise between the United States Army and the Armed Forces of Bosnia and Herzegovina on mount Manjača, south of the city Banja Luka in Bosnia and Herzegovina, while Dodik refused to attend it.

On 5 January 2022, the United States Office of Foreign Assets Control imposed sanctions on Dodik under Executive Order 14033 ('Blocking Property and Suspending Entry Into the United States of Certain Persons Contributing to the Destabilizing Situation in the Western Balkans'). In making the announcement, Under Secretary of the Treasury for Terrorism and Financial Intelligence Brian E. Nelson said that "Milorad Dodik’s destabilizing corrupt activities and attempts to dismantle the Dayton Peace Accords, motivated by his own self-interest, threaten the stability of Bosnia and Herzegovina and the entire region". On 11 April 2022, Dodik and Željka Cvijanović, the president of Republika Srpska, were sanctioned by the United Kingdom for attempting to undermine the legitimacy of Bosnia and Herzegovina, with British Foreign Secretary Liz Truss stating that Dodik and Cvijanović "are deliberately undermining the hard-won peace in Bosnia and Herzegovina. Encouraged by Putin [Vladimir Putin], their reckless behavior threatens stability and security across the Western Balkans."

On 16 November 2022, Dodik was succeeded by Željka Cvijanović as the Serb member of the Presidency.

COVID-19 pandemic

As the COVID-19 pandemic in Bosnia and Herzegovina started in March 2020, the Presidency announced Armed Forces' placement of quarantine tents at the country's borders intended for Bosnian citizens returning home. Every Bosnian citizen arriving to the country was obligated to self-quarantine for 14 days starting from the day of arrival. Tents were set up on the northern border with Croatia.

On 21 December 2020, Dodik was admitted to hospital due to bilateral pneumonia, but did not contract COVID-19. One day later though, on 22 December, it was confirmed that he tested positive for COVID-19; by 28 December, Dodik recovered.

On 2 March 2021, Serbian president Aleksandar Vučić came to Sarajevo and met with Dodik and other presidency members, Džaferović and Komšić, and donated 10,000 dozes of AstraZeneca COVID-19 vaccines for the COVID-19 pandemic. Three days later, on 5 March, Slovenian president Borut Pahor also came to Sarajevo and met with Dodik, Džaferović and Komšić, and stated that Slovenia will also donate 4,800 AstraZeneca COVID-19 vaccines for the pandemic.

On 21 April 2021, he received his first dose of the Sputnik V COVID-19 vaccine.

Opposal of the High Representative

On 27 May 2021, Valentin Inzko resigned from his office of the High Representative for Bosnia and Herzegovina, with German politician Christian Schmidt set to become the new High Representative on 1 August 2021, after getting nominated by the German government. This was met with disapproval by Dodik, with him stating that "we [Republika Srpska] do not accept Schmidt, everything is a simple bluff of the international community." A few days later, Dodik said that "Schmidt will have no legitimacy for Republika Srpska unless he gets confirmed by the United Nations Security Council", adding that Republika Srpska will "receive Schmidt only as a tourist if he does not get confirmed by the Security Council."

On 29 June, Bosnian Foreign Minister Bisera Turković had a heated diplomatic exchange with Russian Ambassador to the United Nations Vasily Nebenzya at a United Nations Security Council meeting in New York City. The topic of the meeting was the political situation in Bosnia and Herzegovina, with focus being on the Office of the High Representative, regarding if it's time for its closure after being created in 1995 following the Bosnian War. Her address at the Security Council was heavily criticized by Dodik. Some days before, Dodik unsuccessfully tried to prevent Turković's Security Council address, even writing a letter to Russian Foreign Minister Sergey Lavrov asking him for help.

In the last ten days of his term as High Representative, on 23 July 2021, Valentin Inzko unexpectedly imposed changes to the law banning the denial of genocide in Bosnia and Herzegovina. This was met with outrage by Bosnian Serb politicians, especially by Dodik, stating "We [Republika Srpska] are forced to go into dissolution" and repeating many times that the "genocide did not happen." As a response to Inzko's imposed law, most Serb representatives in the national institutions, led by Dodik, decided to reject Inzko's law, as well as deciding not to participate in the work of Bosnian national institutions until further notice, sparking a new political crisis in the country.

Following a United Nations Security Council meeting on 4 November 2021, Dodik vowed to sue the new High Representative Christian Schmidt, and described the meeting as a "Victory for Republika Srpska" and proving that "Christian Schmidt is the High Representative only in his mind", even though all the UN Security Council members, except Russia, expressed their support for Schmidt and his powers as High Representative.

On 26 January 2022, following a meeting on constitutional reform in Sarajevo, Dodik said that he and his party would be "willing to participate in the work of the national institutions if a law, banning calling the country's entities genocidal, was passed in Parliament."

Military helicopters controversy
In August 2021, Komšić and Džaferović, without including Dodik, instructed the Ministry of Security to be available for putting out the wildfires in Herzegovina which had formed a few days before. This came after Dodik, as the third member of the Presidency, refused to give consent on the Bosnian Armed Forces to use its military helicopters to help in putting out the fires, because the consent of all three members of the Presidency is required for the military force's helicopters to be used. His actions were met with outrage by Bosnian politicians and media, with Damir Šabanović, the municipal mayor of Jablanica, a town in risk of the wildfires, filing criminal charges against Dodik for "failing or refusing to react and committing a criminal offense by exploiting his official position and failing to perform his official duty."

On 19 August, Dodik justified himself saying that the "Helicopters are 40–50 years old. The people flying them have courage. Of course, that is not the only reason why I did not participate in the Presidency sessions. That reason is well known and it will remain so." However, on 23 August, the Bosnian Defence Minister, Sifet Podžić, reacted to Dodik's statement, saying "The helicopters are perfectly fine, the only reason they didn't help in putting out the fires is Dodik."

Withdrawal of jurisdiction

Following a forestry law passed by the Republika Srpska government, the Constitutional Court of Bosnia and Herzegovina, on 23 September 2021, ruled that the law's provision that the forests are the property of Republika Srpska was unconstitutional. Dodik criticized this decision, stating "In RS [Republika Srpska], everything outside the Constitution and Dayton [Dayton Agreement] should be annulled."

On 27 September, he announced that Republika Srpska will be withdrawing the approvals which it gave to the agreements on the formation of the Armed Forces of Bosnia and Herzegovina and the High Judicial and Prosecutorial Council of Bosnia and Herzegovina. He later on said that no matter what, nothing will be done "outside the Constitution." Although supporting Dodik's opinion regarding the law banning the denial of genocide, Mirko Šarović, the president of the Serb Democratic Party (SDS), the major opposition party in Republika Srpska, does not support the withdrawal of jurisdiction of the Armed Forces and other national institutions, stating "From Dodik's frivolous initiatives, Republika Srpska will become a target, we have no use of these decisions."

On 20 October 2021, the National Assembly of Republika Srpska just narrowly voted to form an entity Medicines Agency, thus withdrawing their support for the national Bosnian Medicines Agency. The opposition, including the SDS and the Party of Democratic Progress, did not attend the vote in protest against Dodik and his actions.

On 8 November 2021, Dodik announced further withdrawal from the Armed Forces, stating "We will not allow the Armed Forces to become a Muslim army" and saying that "It is good for Bosnia and Herzegovina to be demilitarized, that was our earlier proposal." Following Dodik's actions, the House of Commons of the United Kingdom organized a debate on the situation in Bosnia and Herzegovina, during which great accusations were made against the work of Dodik, but also Serbia and Russia as countries that support his doings.

On 10 December 2021, the Republika Srpska National Assembly adopted a set of conclusions, including those regarding the Armed Forces, paving the way for the withdrawal of jurisdiction from national to entity levels. Once again, in protest, the opposition did not attend the vote and refused to support the conclusions, stating "This is a farce and a simple election campaign."

Foreign policy

In May 2021, during a flareup in the Israeli–Palestinian conflict, Dodik was thanked by Israeli Prime Minister Benjamin Netanyahu for expressing his support for Israel, unlike his presidency counterparts who expressed their support for Palestine.

In June 2021, Dodik signed the SEECP Declaration in Antalya, Turkey, which among other things, incorporates talks about NATO integration.

On 6 November 2021, he met with Hungarian prime minister Viktor Orbán in Banja Luka, in process thanking him "for the understanding that Hungary has for Republika Srpska." Orbán said that "Republika Srpska is key to peace in the Balkans" and that Hungary will "expand its economic program with Republika Srpska."

On 2 December 2021, Dodik had a meeting with Russian president Vladimir Putin in Moscow, with Dodik stating "He [Putin] is familiar with the details of the situation in Bosnia and Herzegovina." Following Russia recognizing the Donetsk People's Republic and the Luhansk People's Republic as independent states on 21 February 2022, which are disputed territories in the Ukrainian region of Donbas, Dodik said that Republika Srpska will seek neutrality at the national level regarding the issue of Ukraine. On 24 February, Putin ordered a large-scale invasion of Ukraine, marking a dramatic escalation of the Russo-Ukrainian War that began in 2014. Regarding the invasion, Dodik said that Bosnia and Herzegovina was neutral, having stated the previous day that the "events showed it was a good decision for Bosnia and Herzegovina to not enter NATO, and that the country would not support sanctions."

European Union

Originally a big advocate and supporter of the European Union, Dodik has gradually become much more Eurosceptic and critical about the EU.

In September 2020, Dodik and his fellow Presidency members said that an EU candidate status for Bosnia and Herzegovina is possible in the year 2021 if the country "implements successful reforms."

In September 2021, Dodik went to Budapest, Hungary to attend  its Demographic Summit. There he met with Slovenian prime minister Janez Janša on 22 September. On 23 September, Dodik made a speech at the summit, where he criticized the European Union, LGBT community and the handling of the previous European migrant crisis. Apart from Dodik and Janša, the summit was also attended by Hungarian prime minister Viktor Orbán, Serbian president Aleksandar Vučić, Czech prime minister Andrej Babiš, Polish prime minister Mateusz Morawiecki and former U.S. vice president Mike Pence, as well as 2022 French presidential election candidate Éric Zemmour.

On 30 September, Dodik, Džaferović and Komšić met with European Commission President Ursula von der Leyen at the Presidency Building in Sarajevo. This was part of von der Leyen's visit to Bosnia and Herzegovina, since she some hours before opened the Svilaj border checkpoint and a bridge over the nearby Sava river, which bears the internationally important freeway Pan-European Corridor Vc.

In an interview for the largest German news website Der Spiegel, given in October 2021, Dodik, among other things, said that "the Western Balkans have never been further from European Union membership than they are today", thus continuing expressing his Eurosceptic views. In December 2021, German Foreign Minister Annalena Baerbock proposed a "values-driven" foreign policy in conjunction with other European democracies and NATO partners, and called on the EU to implement sanctions against Dodik. On 20 May 2022, Dodik met with European Council President Charles Michel, during his visit to Sarajevo, with whom he discussed about Bosnia and Herzegovina's accession to the EU.

Relations with Turkey

On 16 March 2021, Dodik, Džaferović and Komšić went on a state visit to Turkey to meet with Turkish President Recep Tayyip Erdoğan. While there, Erdoğan promised to donate Bosnia and Herzegovina 30,000 COVID-19 vaccines for the COVID-19 pandemic. Also on the meeting, Bosnia and Herzegovina and Turkey agreed on mutual recognition and exchange of driving licenses, as well as signing an agreement on cooperation in infrastructure and construction projects, which also refers to the construction of a highway from Bosnia's capital Sarajevo to Serbia's capital Belgrade; the agreement being signed by Minister of Communication and Traffic Vojin Mitrović.

On 27 August 2021, Erdoğan came to Sarajevo on a state visit in Bosnia and Herzegovina and met with all three Presidency members, having talks about more economic and infrastructural cooperation, as well as looking into the construction of the highway from Sarajevo to Belgrade. Also, a trilateral meeting between Turkey, Serbia and Bosnia and Herzegovina was agreed on and should happen in the near future.

In November 2021, Dodik went to Ankara and again met with Erdoğan. His meeting with Erdoğan was focused on the political crisis in Bosnia and Herzegovina, following Valentin Inzko's imposed changes to the law banning genocide denial in the country. At the meeting, as reported by Dodik, it was said that "the threat of force cannot solve any problem" and that "speculators imposed the story of a possible conflict."

President of Republika Srpska

First and second term (2010–2018)

In October 2010, Dodik narrowly won the RS presidential election already in the first round, thus becoming the 8th president of the republic.

On 30 November 2010, leaked United States diplomatic cables revealed that Dodik supported the Ahtisaari plan for the independence of Kosovo. The cable was sent by Daniel Fried, a U.S. State Department official, in May 2007 and quoted Dodik as stating that "Kosovo's recognition would follow after such a decision (to adopt the plan) by the UN Security Council". Dodik denied the accusations and stated that Daniel Fried was a liar and a troublemaker.

In May 2011, Dodik planned to have a referendum held in June that he viewed would reflect on the rejection of Bosnian state institutions, including the war crimes court. The High Representative for Bosnia and Herzegovina, Valentin Inzko, warned that the referendum could potentially jeopardize the Dayton Agreement. However, shortly after tensions increased in regards to the proposed referendum, Republika Srpska decided to cancel the referendum, after Dame Catherine Ashton, EU's High Representative of the Union for Foreign Affairs and Security Policy reassured Dodik in Banja Luka that EU will examine the complaints of RS on abuses in justice system of Bosnia and Herzegovina, and recommend the changes.

On 25 October 2011, Dodik spoke on "An American Foreign Policy Success Story: The Dayton Accords, Republika Srpska and Bosnia's European Integration" at Columbia University. The event was protested by numerous organizations including the Congress of North American Bosniaks, the Advisory Council for Bosnia and Herzegovina, the Canadian Institute for the Research of Genocide, the Bosnian American Genocide Institute and Education Center, and the International Center for Transitional Justice. Protests also took place while the speech was in progress.

In October 2012, Dodik proposed that Bosnia and Herzegovina's unified armed forces be abolished. On 3 November 2012, Dodik announced that the government of Republika Srpska would donate an undisclosed amount to help pay for the renovation of Serbian Orthodox Patriarch Irinej's old residence in Belgrade. Irinej commented that "this is a great opportunity to show practically the unity of the Serbian people and Serbian church outside our borders." Serb bloggers expressed "disagreement with both at a time of severe economic crisis and hardship" followed.

On 13 November 2012, High Representative Valentin Inzko, cited Dodik as "the most frequent, although certainly not the sole, proponent of [Bosnian] state dissolution" in a report to the UN Security Council. He added that "the most recent and troubling of these is an initiative sent by the president to the Republika Srpska National Assembly attempting to create conditions that would unilaterally force the dissolution of the Armed Forces of Bosnia and Herzegovina." Vitaly Churkin, Russian Representative to the United Nations, defended Dodik and blamed the Bosniaks for the tension.

In November 2012, German state prosecution implicated Dodik and his son in a corruption case involving the Hypo Alpe-Adria-Bank International. The investigation concerned "several criminal offenses, including falsifying of documents, faking financial and business reports and fraud." The judicial system of Bosnia and Herzegovina initially investigated the case following a complaint filing, but "political pressures soon stopped the judicial bodies and the police in the RS." According to Domagoj Margetić, a Croatian journalist, Dodik had bribed and threatened him in order to not link him to the Hypo Group Alpe Adria affair story. On 26 November 2012, High Representative in Bosnia and Herzegovina, Valentin Inzko, confirmed that there was no investigation against President of Republika Srpska Milorad Dodik and his family in Germany or Austria.

On 1 January 2017, the U.S. Department of the Treasury's Office of Foreign Assets Control (OFAC) imposed sanctions on Dodik pursuant to Executive Order 13304 and due to his role in defying the Constitutional Court of Bosnia and Herzegovina. "By obstructing the Dayton Accords, Milorad Dodik poses a significant threat to the sovereignty and territorial integrity of Bosnia and Herzegovina," said John E. Smith, Acting OFAC Director.  "Today's action underscores the U.S. commitment to the Dayton Accords and supports international efforts for the country's continued European integration." Any property of Mr. Milorad Dodik within the U.S. jurisdiction is to be blocked and U.S. persons, individuals or companies, are prohibited in to engage in business transactions with him.

Third term (2022–present)

2022 general election

On 1 July 2022, Dodik announced his candidacy in the Republika Srpska general election, running for a third time as president of Republika Srpska.

Following the release of the preliminary results in the Republika Srpska election, opposition parties filed accusations of electoral fraud directly against Dodik, who they claimed had coordinated stuffing ballot boxes with thousands of illegal votes to put the Alliance of Independent Social Democrats ahead in the polls and that Jelena Trivić of the Party of Democratic Progress was the true winner of the Republika Srpska presidential election. As a result of the allegations, the Central Election Commission began a recount the ballots. When the Election Commission verified the preliminary results, they did not verify the Republika Srpska elections. However on 27 October, officials confirmed Dodik's victory. The commission noted that while there were irregularities, none were on a level that would have changed the outcome of the election.

Tenure
Dodik was sworn in as president on 15 November 2022 in the National Assembly of Republika Srpska, succeeding Željka Cvijanović.

Views

Opinions on Tuzla and Markale
In 2009, Dodik stated that the Tuzla massacre was staged and questioned the Markale massacres in Sarajevo. The city of Tuzla filed charges against Dodik over these statements. The city of Sarajevo filed criminal charges against Dodik for abuse of power, and inciting ethnic, racial and religious hatred.

The Office of the High Representative said Dodik denied the war crimes committed and stated that "When such skewed facts come from an official in a position of high responsibility, an official who is obliged to uphold the Dayton Peace Accords and cooperate with the Hague Tribunal, then they are particularly irresponsible and undermine not only the institutions responsible for upholding the rule of law, but the credibility of the individual himself".

Genocide and Srebrenica massacre denial

Dodik described the Srebrenica massacre as a "fabricated myth".

He stated in an interview with the Belgrade newspaper Večernje novosti in April 2010 that "we cannot and will never accept qualifying that event as a genocide", and disowned the 2004 Republika Srpska report which had acknowledged the scale of the killing and had apologised to the relatives of the victims, claiming that the report had been adopted because of pressure from the international community. Without substantiating the figure, he claimed that the number of victims was 3,500 rather than the 7,000 accepted by the report, alleging that 500 listed victims were alive and that over 250 people buried in the Srebrenica Genocide Memorial in Potočari had died elsewhere. During the same month, on 10 April 2010, Dodik initiated a revision of the 2004 report saying that the numbers of killed were exaggerated and the report was manipulated by a former peace envoy. The Office of the High Representative responded and stated that: "The Republika Srpska government should reconsider its conclusions and align itself with the facts and legal requirements and act accordingly, rather than inflicting emotional distress on the survivors, torture history and denigrate the public image of the country".

On 12 July 2010, at the 15th anniversary of the Srebrenica massacre, Dodik declared that he acknowledges the killings that happened on the site, but does not regard what happened at Srebrenica as genocide, differing from the conclusions of the ICTY and of the International Court of Justice, stating that, "(i)f a genocide happened then it was committed against Serb people of this region where women, children and the elderly were killed en masse," referring to eastern Bosnia. In December 2010, Dodik condemned the Peace Implementation Council (PIC), an international community of 55 countries, for referring to the Srebrenica massacre as genocide.

He used variety of claims, espoused by other deniers and conspiracy theorists, such as that Srebrenica was, in fact, revenge for the 1993 Kravica attack and other alleged Bosnian Muslim crimes against Serbs.

In 2017, Dodik introduced legislation, effectively banning the teaching of the Srebrenica genocide and Sarajevo siege in Republika Srpska's schools, stating that it was "impossible to use here the textbooks … which say the Serbs have committed genocide and kept Sarajevo under siege. This is not correct and this will not be taught here".

On 14 August 2018, again initiated by Dodik after his previous attempt in 2010, the National Assembly of Republika Srpska dismissed the 2004 report and decided for a new commission to be assembled to revise report surrounding events in Srebrenica and area around the town in July 1995. This move was immediately criticized by the international community.

The Humanitarian Law Center, in their report signed by 31 high-profile signatories, described this new development as "the culmination of more than a decade of genocide denial and historical revisionism by the SNSD government in Republika Srpska". The United States State Department issued a communique in which they criticized the move, describing it as "(a)ttempts to reject or amend the report on Srebrenica are part of wider efforts to revise the facts of the past war, to deny history, and to politicize tragedy".

Radovan Karadžić
In March 2016, a student dormitory in Pale was named in honor of the wartime Serb leader Radovan Karadžić, an act which was supported by Dodik. The event took place only a few days before Karadžić was convicted for war crimes by the ICTY.

In December 2020, the plaque honoring Karadžić had to be removed after High Representative Inzko, with the help of Karadžić's daughter Sonja Karadžić-Jovičević, publicly called for its removal.

Personal life
Milorad is married to Snježana Dodik, with whom he has two children. His nephew is Bosnian businessman and football administrator Vico Zeljković.

Honours
Order of the Republic of Serbia
Order of the Republika Srpska
Order of Friendship
Award of the International Foundation for the Unity of Orthodox Christian Nations
Order of Peter the Great with Sash – awarded by the National Committee for Social Awards of the Russian Federation for extraordinary contribution to enhancement of the Russian – Serbian cooperation
Order of the Nemanjić dynasty
Order of St. Sava
Order of Saint Simeon the Myrrh-streaming
Order of the Saint bishop Nikolaj
Holy Cross of the Holy Sepulchre Guardians, awarded by Greek Orthodox Patriarch of Jerusalem

Honorary awards
Honorary president of KK Partizan
Honorary citizen of Drvar
Honorary citizen of Gradiška
Honorary citizen of Trebinje

References

Bibliography

External links

Official biography
SNSD Official Website
President of the Republic Milorad Dodik

1959 births
Living people
People from Banja Luka
Serbs of Bosnia and Herzegovina
University of Belgrade Faculty of Political Science alumni
Bosnia and Herzegovina politicians
Alliance of Independent Social Democrats politicians
Prime ministers of Republika Srpska
Members of the Presidency of Bosnia and Herzegovina
Chairmen of the Presidency of Bosnia and Herzegovina
Serbian nationalists
Deniers of the Bosnian genocide
Yugoslav men's basketball players
KK Igokea
Specially Designated Nationals and Blocked Persons List